is a quasi-national park in the Kantō region of Honshū in Japan. It is rated a protected landscape (category V) according to the IUCN. The park includes the Tanzawa Mountains, Miyagase Dam and its surrounding forests, Hayato Great Falls, and the religious sites of Mount Ōyama in the mountains of western Kanagawa Prefecture.

In May 1960, a 38,762-hectare area of western Kanagawa Prefecture in the Tanzawa Mountains was designated for protection as the Tanzawa-Ōyama Prefectural Natural Park. The central portion of this area was further designated a quasi-national park on March 25, 1965.

Like all Quasi-National Parks in Japan, the park is managed by the local prefectural governments.

The park spans the borders of the municipalities of Atsugi, Hadano, Isehara, Kiyokawa, Matsuda, Sagamihara, and Yamakita.

See also

 List of national parks of Japan
 Wildlife Protection Areas in Japan

References
Southerland, Mary and Britton, Dorothy. The National Parks of Japan. Kodansha International (1995). 

National parks of Japan
Parks and gardens in Kanagawa Prefecture
Protected areas established in 1965
1965 establishments in Japan
Atsugi, Kanagawa
Hadano, Kanagawa
Isehara, Kanagawa
Kiyokawa, Kanagawa
Matsuda, Kanagawa
Sagamihara
Yamakita, Kanagawa